The 1989 Utah State Aggies football team represented Utah State University during the 1989 NCAA Division I-A football season as a member of the Big West Conference. The Aggies were led by fourth-year head coach Chuck Shelton and played their home games at Romney Stadium in Logan, Utah. After a difficult 0–4 start (including two Top 25 opponents and two in-state rivalry games), the Aggies finished the season winning four of seven to finish with a record of four wins and seven losses (4–7, 4–3 Big West).

Schedule

References

Utah State
Utah State Aggies football seasons
Utah State Aggies football